Nathan William Enderle (born January 12, 1988) is a former American football quarterback. He played college football at Idaho, where he was a four-year starter. Enderle was selected in the fifth round of the 2011 NFL Draft by the Chicago Bears.  He was a member of the Jacksonville Jaguars during the 2012 preseason and the Tennessee Titans and San Diego Chargers during the 2013 preseason.

Early years
Born and raised in North Platte, Nebraska, Enderle graduated from North Platte High School in 2006. As a junior in 2004 he tied the Nebraska high school records for completions in a season with 166 and completions in a game with 24. As a senior, he completed 129 of 258 passes for 1,481 yards and 13 touchdowns.

College career
After being redshirted as a freshman in 2006 under head coach Dennis Erickson, Enderle started nine of 12 games for the Vandals under new coach Robb Akey in 2007, missing three games due to a ruptured tendon in throwing hand. He finished the season completing 132 of 298 passes for 1,787 yards, 10 touchdowns and 18 interceptions. As a sophomore in 2008 he started all 12 games, completing 184 of 339 passes for 2,077 yards, 20 touchdowns and 17 interceptions. As a junior in 2009 he played in 11 of 13 games, missing two with a shoulder injury. He finished the season completing 192 of 312 passes for 2,906 yards, 22 touchdowns and nine interceptions. During the 2009 Humanitarian Bowl he helped lead the Vandals to a 43-42 comeback win over Bowling Green. During the game, he completed 15 of 28 passes for 240 yards and four touchdowns with no interceptions.  With the game tied at 35 with less than a minute to go, overtime was probable until the Vandal defense gave up a late, 51-yard touchdown pass.  With the Vandals trailing by seven points with 32 seconds remaining on their own 34-yard line, Enderle quickly drove his team down the field and completed a 16-yard touchdown pass with four seconds left to pull within a point, then completed another for the two-point conversion to win. In 2010, the Vandals went 6-7 with an inexperienced offensive line, and lost two road games in the final seconds. Enderle ended his career at Idaho with over 10,000 yards in passing, and graduated in December 2010 with a degree in art.

College statistics

Professional career

Chicago Bears
Enderle was selected by the Chicago Bears in the fifth round of the 2011 NFL Draft. The 160th overall pick, he was the tenth of the twelve quarterbacks selected.

Following the lockout of 2011, the Bears signed Enderle to a four-year contract on July 27, 2011. After his rookie year as a reserve, he was waived by the Bears on June 14, 2012, as the Bears changed offensive coordinators.

Jacksonville Jaguars
A week after his release by the Bears, Enderle signed with the Jacksonville Jaguars on June 21; he was released two months later on August 25, 2012.

Tennessee Titans
On January 17, 2013, Enderle signed with the Titans. On July 24, 2013, Enderle was waived by the Titans.

San Diego Chargers
On July 31, 2013, Enderle was signed by the San Diego Chargers. On August 25, 2013, he was waived by the Chargers.

Montreal Alouettes
On September 21, 2013 Enderle signed with the Montreal Alouettes of the Canadian Football League. He was released on October 3, 2013.

Portland Thunder
On December 9, 2013, Enderle was assigned with the Portland Thunder of the Arena Football League.

See also
List of Division I FBS passing yardage leaders

References

External links
Go Vandals.com - Nathan Enderle

1988 births
Living people
American football quarterbacks
Idaho Vandals football players
Chicago Bears players
Tennessee Titans players
People from North Platte, Nebraska
Players of American football from Nebraska
Jacksonville Jaguars players
San Diego Chargers players
Portland Thunder players